"Enrédame" is the first single by Colombian recording artist Fonseca. It was written and produced by the singer himself, for his third album "Gratitud". The song was released digitally on April 22, 2008.

Track listing

Charts

References

2008 singles
Fonseca (singer) songs
Spanish-language songs
Songs written by Fonseca (singer)
2008 songs
EMI Latin singles